In psychology, preparedness is a concept developed to explain why certain associations are learned more readily than others. For example, phobias related to survival, such as snakes, spiders, and heights, are much more common and much easier to induce in the laboratory than other kinds of fears. According to Martin Seligman, this is a result of our evolutionary history. The theory states that organisms which learned to fear environmental threats faster had a survival and reproductive advantage. Consequently, the innate predisposition to fear these threats became an adaptive human trait.

The concept of preparedness has also been used to explain why taste aversions are learned so quickly and efficiently compared with other kinds of classical conditioning.

References

External links
The Malicious Serpent: Snakes as a Prototypical Stimulus for an Evolved Module of Fear link not working

Learning
Preparedness